Kirchner Peak is a somewhat isolated peak,  high, located  north-northeast of Gaylord Ridge in the Nebraska Peaks, Antarctica. It was named by the Advisory Committee on Antarctic Names after J.F. Kirchner, a member of the United States Antarctic Research Program geophysical field party during the Ross Ice Shelf Project, 1974–75 and 1976–77 seasons.

References

Mountains of Oates Land